Otake Dainichi Nyorai (お竹大日如来 or 於竹大日如来), who is also known as Otake, is a figure in the Japanese Buddhist tradition.  

She was a humble maidservant of the Sakuma family in Odenma-cho in Edo, who lived during the 17th century. She was a very religious woman of great Buddhist virtue. She gave all she had to the poor, ate hardly any food, and performed the most menial chores with extreme diligence.  A group of mountain ascetics, who were searching for the reincarnation of the Nyorai Buddha, found her. When Otake bent down to pick up a few grains of rice that had fallen on the floor, a halo-like light surrounded her, convincing the ascetics that they had come upon a divine being. Otake is often portrayed with an object behind her head that resembles a halo, or with a shadow or reflection identifying her as a buddha.

References
Joly, Henri L., Legend in Japanese Art, Charles E. Tuttle Co., Rutland Vermont, 1967, pp. 396–99
Nichibunken, Otake Dainichi-nyorai Engi Emaki, Nichibunken (International Research Center for Japanese Studies), Kyoto, 2002

Footnotes

Vairocana Buddha
Buddhist mythology